James Lepp (born November 19, 1983) is a Canadian professional golfer and entrepreneur.

Lepp was born in Abbotsford, British Columbia and attended high school at the Mennonite Educational Institute. He began his collegiate golf career at the University of Illinois. In 2005, he won the NCAA Division I Championship while playing for the University of Washington, the first Canadian male to do so. He turned professional in 2006 and joined the Canadian Tour in 2007, winning one event.

In the movie Sideways, Lepp is shown briefly while Myles and Jack are watching golf on TV.

Lepp stopped competing on professional tours in 2010 as he launched Kikkor Golf, a sneaker-inspired golf shoe brand. In 2016, he transitioned Kikkor Golf into a new limited edition sneaker brand called Six Hundred Four. The Six Hundred Four flagship store, called a "Sneaker Gallery", is located in the Gastown neighbourhood of Vancouver, British Columbia.

Amateur wins
this list may be incomplete

2001 Canadian Junior Amateur
2002 Canadian Junior Amateur, British Columbia Amateur
2003 British Columbia Amateur, Pacific Coast Amateur
2004 British Columbia Amateur
2005 British Columbia Amateur, NCAA Division I Championship

Professional wins (2)

Canadian Tour wins (2)

Team appearances
Amateur
Eisenhower Trophy (representing Canada): 2002, 2004

References

External links

Kikkor Golf

Canadian male golfers
Illinois Fighting Illini men's golfers
Washington Huskies men's golfers
Golfing people from British Columbia
Sportspeople from Abbotsford, British Columbia
1983 births
Living people
Canadian Mennonites